Deb Olin Unferth (born November 19, 1968) is an American short story writer, novelist, and memoirist. She is the author of the collection of stories Minor Robberies, the novel Vacation, both published by McSweeney's, and the memoir, Revolution: The Year I Fell in Love and Went to Join the War, published by Henry Holt. Unferth was a finalist for a 2012 National Book Critics Circle Award for her memoir, Revolution.

Career
Her work has appeared in Harper's, The New York Times, The Paris Review, Granta, McSweeney's, The Believer, The Boston Review, Esquire, and other magazines. She is a frequent contributor to Noon. She also has received two Pushcart Prizes. Unferth is an associate professor in creative writing at The University of Texas at Austin, where she teaches for the Michener Center and the New Writers Project.

Prison Education
She founded and runs the Pen-City Writers, a two-year creative-writing certificate program at a maximum security prison in southern Texas. For this work she won the 2017 Texas Governor's Criminal Justice Service Award.

Books
Barn 8 (novel, Graywolf Press), 2020
Wait Till You See Me Dance (story collection, Graywolf Press), 2017 
 I, Parrot (graphic novel) with Elizabeth Haidle, 2017
 Revolution (memoir, Henry Holt), 2011
 Vacation (novel, McSweeney's), 2008
 Minor Robberies (short stories, McSweeney's), 2007

Awards
Guggenheim Fellowship, 2018
Pushcart Prize for "Likeable," 2014
National Book Critics Award finalist for Revolution, 2012
Pushcart Prize, 2011
Creative Capital Grant for Literature, 2009
Cabell First Novelist Award for Vacation, 2009
Pushcart Prize, 2005

Online Texts

Nonfiction
 Memoir Manifesto
 Where I Write
 Unferth reads from her memoir Revolution on the InDigest podcast

Short fiction 
 Minor Robberies

Interviews 
 Interview on The Rumpus
 Interview on HTMLGIANT
 Interview on Bookslut with Tao Lin
 2011 radio interview (50 minutes) at The Bat Segundo Show
 "I Start From a Place of Outrage and Sadness": A conversation on humor in fiction with Elisa Albert, Steve Almond, Brock Clarke, Sam Lipsyte, Zachary Martin, John McNally, and Deb Olin Unferth in Gulf Coast: A Journal of Literature and Fine Arts (24.2)

References

External links

21st-century American novelists
American women novelists
American women short story writers
Wesleyan University faculty
Living people
1969 births
21st-century American women writers
21st-century American short story writers
MacDowell Colony fellows
American women academics